Eocottus is an extinct genus of prehistoric bony fish that lived from the early to middle Eocene.

See also

 Prehistoric fish
 List of prehistoric bony fish

References

Scorpaeniformes genera
Prehistoric ray-finned fish genera
Eocene fish